These are the official results of the Women's Javelin Throw event at the 1990 European Championships in Split, Yugoslavia, held at Stadion Poljud on 29 and 30 August 1990. All results were made with a rough surfaced javelin (old design).

Medalists

Abbreviations
All results shown are in metres

Records

Final

†: Felicia Ţilea ranked initially 9th (58.80m), but was disqualified for infringement of IAAF doping rules.

Qualification

Group A

†: Felicia Ţilea initially reached the final (60.96m), but was disqualified later for infringement of IAAF doping rules.

Group B

‡: All three attempts from Päivi Alafrantti were initially voided.  In the only measurable throw, the javelin landed flat.  After a protest of the Finnish team officials and video inspection, the decision was reverted because it could be shown that the tip of the javelin struck the ground first, and Alafrantti was admitted to compete in the final.

Participation
According to an unofficial count, 19 athletes from 10 countries participated in the event.

 (1)
 (3)
 (3)
 (1)
 (1)
 (2)
 (1)
 (2)
 (3)
 (2)

See also
 1988 Women's Olympic Javelin Throw (Seoul)
 1991 Women's World Championships Javelin Throw (Tokyo)
 1992 Women's Olympic Javelin Throw (Barcelona)

References

 Results
 todor66

Javelin throw
Javelin throw at the European Athletics Championships
1990 in women's athletics